Utricularia sect. Orchidioides is a section in the genus Utricularia. The species in this section are small or medium-sized terrestrial or epiphytic carnivorous plants native to Central and South America. Alphonse Pyrame de Candolle originally published this section in 1844. In 1916, John Hendley Barnhart moved the section to its own genus, Orchyllium, recognizing that the species in this section are distinct. Several other botanists, including Henry Gleason, considered the treatment of these species in the genus Orchyllium valid and moved other species from Utricularia to Orchyllium. Ultimately the species were all reunited under Utricularia.

See also 
 List of Utricularia species

References 

Utricularia
Plant sections